Senior is a 2015 Thai horror film directed by Wisit Sasanatieng. It stars Jannine Weigel, Phongsakon Tosuwan and Sa-ad Piampongsan in the main roles. It is available on Viu Indonesia  with Indonesian subtitles.

Plot
A pair of detective buddies from two different dimensions team up to solve a murder that took place half a century ago. One of them is Adhiti, a grade-12 high school student of a convent boarding school. The other is a spirit of a senior student of the school. Adhiti and the Senior take up the investigation in order to find the real murderer. They dig up evidence and locate witnesses, and along the way, they encounter men, women, as well as vengeful spirits that try to stop them from finding out the truth. At the same time, Adhiti has to find out the true identity of her buddy: who's the Senior?

Cast
Jannine Weigel as Mademoiselle Adhiti(Mon)
Phongsakon Tosuwan as Senior
Nutticha Namwong as Ant
Raweeroj Lertphiphopmetha as Dr.No
Kara Polasit as Her Serene Highness Princess Barnnavadi Rasmi
Pornphan Kasemmatsu as Ma Mere Hannah
Sa-ad Piampongsan as Dr. Sa-noe
Piathip Kumwong as Wipa
Sutthipha Kongnawdee as Piangfah
Nabeya Kulanet as Ma Mere Audrey

See also
List of ghost films
List of Thai films

References

2015 films
2015 horror films
Thai horror films
Thai-language films